Radhika Thilak (1969 – 20 September 2015) was an Indian Malayalam-language playback singer. She sang 70 songs for Malayalam films.

Career
Some of her songs are "Arunakirana deepam", "Deva sangeetham",  "Maya manchalil", "Kaithapoo manam", "Thiruvathira thira nokkiya", "Ente ulludukkum kotti" and "Ninte kannil". Her song "Ilampani Thuli" from Tamil movie Aaradhanai(1981) is well remembered. Apart from film songs, she also sang  200 devotional songs. She was also a TV anchor.

Awards
In 2002 Kerala film critics association awarded her best female playback singer award for her song Omanamalare ninmaran from the film Kunjikoonan.

Death 
On 20 September 2015, Radhika was admitted to a private hospital in Kochi in the evening and was declared dead at around 8 pm. She was 45. Radhika had been undergoing treatment for cancer for nearly two years.

References

External links

Year of birth uncertain
2015 deaths
Indian women playback singers
Malayalam playback singers
Deaths from cancer in India
Singers from Kochi
Film musicians from Kerala
21st-century Indian singers
20th-century Indian singers
20th-century Indian women singers
21st-century Indian women singers
1969 births
Women musicians from Kerala
St. Teresa's College alumni